Julio Vega Batlle (May 6, 1899 – April 23, 1973) was a Dominican writer, publishing both plays and novels, and a diplomat. He was born in Santiago de los Caballeros, and graduated from the University of Santo Domingo. He became a judge, and served as a diplomat for the Dominican Republic on missions to London, England; Havana, Cuba; and Rio de Janeiro, Brazil.

He married Teresa de Boyrie de Moya, daughter of Louis Emile de Boyrie Pillot (of French origin) and Mercedes Antonia de Moya y Moya (from an upper-class Dominican family); they begat three sons: Wenceslao Nicolás, Bernardo, and Luis Eduardo “Eddy”.

Ancestry

Further reading 
 Julio Vega Batlle's novel Anadel: La Novela de la Gastorsofia is available online in the Digital Library of the Caribbean (dLOC)
 Anthology of Major Dominican Literature

1899 births
1973 deaths
Descendants of Ulises Espaillat
Dominican Republic novelists
Male novelists
Dominican Republic male writers
Dominican Republic diplomats
People from Santiago de los Caballeros
Dominican Republic dramatists and playwrights
Male dramatists and playwrights
Dominican Republic people of Catalan descent
Dominican Republic people of French descent
Dominican Republic people of Italian descent
20th-century novelists
20th-century dramatists and playwrights
20th-century male writers
White Dominicans